Patrick J. Callaghan (October 15, 1866 in Cleveland, Ohio - February 4, 1940 in Louisville, Kentucky) was a professional baseball player who was a third baseman in the Major Leagues in 1884. He played for the Indianapolis Hoosiers.

References

External links

1866 births
1940 deaths
Major League Baseball third basemen
Indianapolis Hoosiers (AA) players
19th-century baseball players
Scranton Indians players